The 1989 Jordanian  League (known as The Jordanian  League,   was the 39th season of Jordan League since its inception in 1944. Al-Faysali won its  22nd title.

Teams

Map

Overview
Al-Faysali won the championship.

League standings

References
RSSSF

Jordanian Pro League seasons
Jordan
Jordan
football